Matatoki is a locality on the Hauraki Plains of New Zealand. It lies on State Highway 26, south east of Thames and north of Paeroa. The Matatoki Stream runs from the Coromandel Range through the area to join the Waihou River.

The Kopu sawmill, a few km north of Matatoki, closed at the end of June, 2008, with the loss of 145 jobs.

History

The eastern bank of the Waihou River near Matatoki was the location for many Hauraki Māori pā, such as Oruarangi pā and Paterangi pā, which were likely first settled in the 1300s. Between the 1930s and 1960s, Oruarangi pā was an important archaeological site for Classic period Māori artifacts.

Demographics

Matatoki-Puriri had a population of 1,059 at the 2018 New Zealand census, an increase of 57 people (5.7%) since the 2013 census, and a decrease of 3 people (−0.3%) since the 2006 census. There were 396 households, comprising 540 males and 519 females, giving a sex ratio of 1.04 males per female. The median age was 45.5 years (compared with 37.4 years nationally), with 204 people (19.3%) aged under 15 years, 165 (15.6%) aged 15 to 29, 507 (47.9%) aged 30 to 64, and 180 (17.0%) aged 65 or older.

Ethnicities were 93.2% European/Pākehā, 17.0% Māori, 1.4% Pacific peoples, 0.6% Asian, and 0.8% other ethnicities. People may identify with more than one ethnicity.

The percentage of people born overseas was 8.5, compared with 27.1% nationally.

Although some people chose not to answer the census's question about religious affiliation, 59.5% had no religion, 28.0% were Christian, 0.6% had Māori religious beliefs, 0.3% were Hindu and 0.8% had other religions.

Of those at least 15 years old, 90 (10.5%) people had a bachelor's or higher degree, and 234 (27.4%) people had no formal qualifications. The median income was $32,800, compared with $31,800 nationally. 108 people (12.6%) earned over $70,000 compared to 17.2% nationally. The employment status of those at least 15 was that 477 (55.8%) people were employed full-time, 153 (17.9%) were part-time, and 15 (1.8%) were unemployed.

Education

Railway station 

Matatoki had a railway station, just south of the village, from 1898 to 1995 on the Thames Branch. Larkins and O'Brien built the Kopu to Hikutaia section from August 1885 for £10,879, had made good progress by January 1886 and completed that section through Matatoki in May 1887. Heath and Irwin started building the Hikutaia to Paeroa section, to the south, in January 1887. Work on the Paeroa to Te Aroha section began in 1892, but in 1895 it was said, "a Parliamentary faction stopped the workers in their work". Work on the bridges resumed in 1897. The Minister of Public Works was able to travel by train from Hikutaia, through Matatoki, to Thames in July 1897.

The Thames to Paeroa section of the line opened on Monday, 19 December 1898, with Matatoki as a flag station. It had a partly built 6th class station (a shelter shed),  x  platform and a loading bank. A year later there was also a passing loop for 35 wagons and a siding. By 1966 there was also a low-level loading bank for Matatoki Quarries to load crushed metal.

Passenger trains were withdrawn on 28 March 1951 and freight on 22 February 1971, though Matatoki reopened for freight on 28 February 1974, closed again on 20 July 1980 and re-opened again on 30 November 1984, until June 28, 1991, the last day of commercial traffic on the Thames branch, which officially closed on March 29, 1995. It is now used by the Hauraki Rail Trail.

References

Thames-Coromandel District
Populated places in Waikato